Thawiphop is a 1986 Thai historical romance novel written by Thommayanti. It tells the story of Maneechan, a contemporary woman who is transported back in time via a magical mirror to the late 19th century, during the reign of King Chulalongkorn (Rama V). There she falls in love with a young nobleman, and ultimately ends up helping defend the country against the threat of colonisation by the French and the British.

The novel has become widely popular, and has been adapted into multiple television series, films and musicals. It has been cited by scholars as a prominent example of nationalist thought in mainstream Thai literature.

Adaptations
Thawiphop has seen many adaptations, including:
Films
Thawiphop (1990), directed by Cherd Songsri
The Siam Renaissance (2004), directed by Surapong Pinijkhar
TV series
Thawiphop (1994), produced by Dara Video and broadcast on Channel 7
Thawiphop (2011), also produced by Dara Video and broadcast on Channel 7
Stage plays
Thawiphop: The Musical (2005), directed by Takonkiet Viravan and produced by Scenario
Thawiphop: The Musical (2011), also directed by Takonkiet Viravan and produced by Scenario

References

Novels by Thommayanti
1986 novels
Historical romance novels
Novels set in the 19th century
History of Thailand in fiction